This article lists the diplomatic missions in Grenada. At present, the capital St. George’s hosts 5 embassies/high commissions. Several other countries are accredited through their embassies in other countries.

Embassies/High Commissions
Saint George's

Honorary Consulates 
Honorary Consulate located in St. George's if not indicated otherwise.

 (St. David's)

 

 (Saint Andrew's)

Non-resident embassies and High Commissions 

  (Port-of-Spain)
  (Port-of-Spain)
  (Bogotá)
  (Kingston)
 (Bridgetown)
  (Bridgetown) 
  (Port-of-Spain)
  (Port-of-Spain)
  (Havana)
  (Mexico City)
  (Port-of-Spain)
  (Castries)
  (Port-of-Spain)
  (Caracas)
  (New York City)
  (New York City)
  (Port-of-Spain)
  (Caracas)
  (Caracas)
  (Santo Domingo)
  (Caracas)
  (Castries)
  (Port-of-Spain)
  (Bridgetown)
  (Caracas)
  (Georgetown)
 (Caracas)
 (Havana)
 (Caracas)
 (Port of Spain)
 (Caracas)
  (Havana)
  (Kingston)
  (Port-of-Spain)
 (Ottawa)
  (Port-of-Spain)
  (New York City)
  (Caracas)

See also 
 Foreign relations of Grenada
 List of diplomatic missions of Grenada

External links 
 Grenada Ministry of Foreign Affairs

References

Grenada
Diplomatic missions
Diplomatic missions